Johan Cruyff Institute is an educational institution, founded by Dutch footballer Johan Cruyff, aimed at educating athletes, sport and business professionals in the field of sport management.

History
The academic institution was founded in 1999 with a program for 35 athletes as part of the Johan Cruyff Academy of Amsterdam and has since then become a global network. In 2002, the Johan Cruyff Institute Barcelona was opened and established as the international headquarters, and the expansion proceeded to Mexico (2003), Amsterdam (2006), Stockholm (2011) and Peru (2013).

There are 4 Johan Cruyff Institute (postgraduate and executive education), 3 Johan Cruyff Academy (graduate education) and 4 Johan Cruyff College (vocational training).

Sports education

Sport management
The sport industry has had a growing impact on the global economy over the last 20 years with investment in public infrastructure, mobilizing resources and creating new professions and jobs. Today it is one of the professional sectors with the most economic momentum, creating opportunities for many people who aspire to a future in the world of sports. Sports Management is a field of education concerning the business aspects of sports.

Sport marketing
In markets that are becoming increasingly more competitive, sport marketing and sponsorship have become high impact areas for business success. Consequently, there is a growing demand for trained specialists in the whole sports marketing cycle, both in sports companies as well as in sports foundations, associations, federations and organizations.

Football business
Football is undoubtedly the most powerful and most popular sport in the world, linking communities, stirring emotions and breaking down cultural barriers. Football has also become one of the most profitable industries, with a significant economic impact in infrastructure development, sponsorships, TV rights and transfers of players.

Coaching
Coaching is about managing oneself, the players & staff, the team and the environment. Each participant’s personal background is the base for their further development and better understanding of themselves as a coach and/or manager.

Rankings
The results of the 2022 rankings of the prestigious magazine SportBusiness International place the Johan Cruyff Institute Master in Sport Management Online in the Top 2 position for online programs offered worldwide and the Master in Sport Management on campus, in the Top 40 for programs offered worldwide.

Notable alumni
 Vivianne Miedema, Dutch professional footballer who plays as a forward for FA Women's Super League (FA WSL) club Arsenal and the Netherlands national team.
 Keylor Navas, Costa Rican professional footballer who plays as a goalkeeper for Ligue 1 club Paris Saint-Germain and the Costa Rica national team.
 Eduarda Amorim, Brazilian handball football player for CSM București.
 Koen de Kort, Dutch former professional cyclist.
 Ana Lucía Martínez, Guatemalan professional footballer who plays as a forward for Italian Serie A club Pomigliano CF and the Guatemala women's national team.
 Bojan Krkic, Professional footballer for J1 League club Vissel Kobe.
 Edwin van der Sar, CEO at AFC Ajax
 Craig Foster, Chief Football Analyst/Presenter at SBS
 Esther Vergeer, Tournament Director – ABN AMRO Wheelchair Tennis Tournament
 Guillermo Ochoa, Mexican professional football goalkeeper
 Edith Bosch, Co-Owner – The Impowerment Company
 Jan Bos, Former Coach – Kia Speedskating Academy
 Richard Schuil, Business Coordinator – Thomas St John Group; Co Owner – TopSport & Finance
 Gretar Steinsson, Technical director at Fleetwood Town FC
 Jordi Villacampa, Former President, Club Joventut Badalona
Sergio Lozano, Professional Futsal player at FC Barcelona
Marlou van Rhijn, Paralympic sprinter
Alfreð Finnbogason, Professional football player for FC Augsburg
Bibian Mentel, Winter Paralympics (Snowboarding) gold-medalist; Founder – Mentelity Foundation 
Akwasi Frimpong, Sprinter, bobsledder, and skeleton athlete; Owner at Golden Events Management (GEM USA)
David Alegre, Spanish field hockey midfielder
Jennifer Pareja, 2012 Summer Olympics waterpolo player silver-medalist
Rubén Vergés, 2010 Olympic halfpipe Snowboarder
Daniëlle van de Donk, player for Olympique Lyonnais Féminin
Lieke Martens, Paris Saint-Germain Féminine player
 Jose Antonio Quintero, vice president at Venezuelan Football Federation.

References

Sports universities and colleges
Education in Barcelona
Educational institutions established in 1999
Johan Cruyff
Educational organisations based in Spain
1999 establishments in the Netherlands